Madhavadhara is a residential area of the city of Visakhapatnam in Andhra Pradesh state, India.

About
It is one of the important residential area in Visakhapatnam. It is totally surrounded with hills and is located in a beautiful natural location.

Radha Madhavaswamy Temple

Madhavadhara is famous for three waterfalls Gomukhadhara, Chakradhara and Madhavadhara and the trio of temples dedicated to Lord Madhava, Lord Venugopala Swamy and Lord Siva. The temples are very ancient and there is an old trekking path from Madhavaswamy temple to Simhachalam Temple. There are also some ruins related to Buddhist stupas around the temple.

Transport
It is well connected with Gajuwaka, NAD X Road, Dwaraka Nagar and other parts of the city. APSRTC buses are available in this area to connect to the core city.

APSRTC routes

References

Neighbourhoods in Visakhapatnam